The Bayer designation γ Sagittarii (Gamma Sagittarii) is shared by two stars in the constellation Sagittarius:

 γ1 Sagittarii, a Cepheid variable better-known as W Sagittarii
 γ2 Sagittarii (10 Sagittarii), an orange giant

 "-": none

The two stars are separated by slightly under one degree.

References

Sagittarius, Gamma
Sagittarius (constellation)